The 1972 Hamilton Tiger-Cats season was the 15th season for the team in the Canadian Football League and their 23rd overall. The Tiger-Cats finished in 1st place in the Eastern Conference with an 11–3 record and won the Grey Cup over the Saskatchewan Roughriders. Ralph Sazio became Tiger-Cats President in 1972, the year in which Hamilton hosted and won the Grey Cup. In 1972, Tony Gabriel improved his receiving numbers to 49 catches for 733 yards, finishing second in the East in passes caught. It would be Tommy Joe Coffey's final season with the Tiger-Cats. Ellison Kelly would be in his final season with the Tiger-Cats. During his 13-year career, he never missed a game, playing in 175 consecutive regular season games. Joe Zuger left the Tiger-Cats to play for the Detroit Lions of the NFL.

Regular season

Season standings

Season schedule

Post-season

Grey Cup

Awards and honours
CFL's Most Outstanding Player Award – Garney Henley (WR)
CFL's Most Outstanding Rookie Award – Chuck Ealey (QB)
Grey Cup's Most Valuable Player, Chuck Ealey (QB)
Grey Cup's Most Valuable Canadian, Ian Sunter (K)

References

Hamilton Tiger-cats Season, 1972
Hamilton Tiger-Cats seasons
James S. Dixon Trophy championship seasons
Grey Cup championship seasons
Hamilton Tiger-Cats